Ildikó Szekeres (born 6 February 1973 in Pécs) is a Hungarian female curler.

On international level she is runner-up of 2009 World Mixed Doubles Curling Championship and bronze medallist of 2013 European Mixed Curling Championship.

On national level she is eleven-time Hungarian women's curling champion (2003, 2004, 2005, 2006, 2007, 2008, 2009, 2010, 2011, 2012, 2013), six-time Hungarian mixed curling champion (2005, 2008, 2011, 2013, 2014, 2015), five-time Hungarian mixed doubles curling champion (2007, 2008, 2010, 2011, 2017), six-time Hungarian Women's Curler of the Year (2005, 2007, 2009, 2010, 2011, 2015).

Teams and events

Women's

Mixed

Mixed doubles

References

External links
 

1973 births
Living people
Hungarian female curlers
Hungarian curling champions
Sportspeople from Pécs